Glendale College may refer to:
Glendale Community College (disambiguation)
Glendale Career College